The Boat That Rocked is a soundtrack album to the 2009 British film of the same title, a comedy about a fictitious British pirate radio station set in 1966. The soundtrack was released March 30, 2009 through Mercury Records as a double album featuring popular rock, pop, and soul artists of the 1960s. It also includes David Bowie's 1983 song "Let's Dance" and a 2009 cover version of "Stay with Me" performed by Duffy, with Lorraine Ellison's original 1966 version included as well. In North America, where the film was retitled Pirate Radio, the soundtrack album was released November 10, 2009 through Universal Republic. The Pirate Radio version omits four tracks that were included on The Boat That Rocked album—"Crimson and Clover" by Tommy James and the Shondells, "The Letter" by The Box Tops, "The End of the World" by Skeeter Davis, and "Hang On Sloopy" by The McCoys—and reverses the order of tracks 7 and 8 on the second disc.

Track listing

The Boat That Rocked version

Pirate Radio version

Charts

Certifications

References 

2009 soundtrack albums
Comedy film soundtracks